Henry Simons Rae (22 October 1895 – 2 November 1967) was a Scottish professional footballer who played professionally as a half back in Scotland and England for Clyde, Brentford, Hamilton Academical and Morton. He was a part of the Third Lanark team which toured South America in 1923. After retiring as a player, Rae served Ayr United, Clyde and Hibernian as trainer and later acted as Brentford's Scotland scout.

Career statistics

References

1895 births
People from Partick
Scottish footballers
Footballers from Glasgow
1967 deaths
English Football League players
Association football wing halves
Brentford F.C. players
Benburb F.C. players
Greenock Morton F.C. players
Clyde F.C. players
Third Lanark A.C. players
Hamilton Academical F.C. players
Ayr United F.C. non-playing staff
Clyde F.C. non-playing staff
Association football coaches
Association football scouts
Hibernian F.C. non-playing staff
Brentford F.C. non-playing staff
Scottish Football League players
Scottish Junior Football Association players